J*Davey is an American music duo from Los Angeles, California. The group consists of vocalist Jack Davey and keyboardist/producer Brook D'Leau, who formed the act after being introduced by a mutual friend in high school.

Background
One of the original pioneers in what has now come to be termed 'dark RnB' and alternative R&B, J*Davey as a duo were raised in Los Angeles, California. It was the early 2000s and the advent of Myspace that allowed their future-leaning brand of funk/electronica to be picked up by some of the most influential early adopters of the time – including Prince on one side of the Atlantic and Gilles Peterson on the other. J*Davey were playing sold out shows and creating music that would become widely recognized as the blueprint for some of the most captivating sounds of the decade in Kelis and The Neptunes. Jack Davey (vocals) and Brook D'Leau (production) then entered what turned out to be a stifling three-year contract with Warner Bros., where bureaucracy and an endless tour schedule lead to a necessary period of hiatus - Jack was busy becoming a mother to her newborn son and Brook was asked by Miguel to come and do the music direction for him on tour. Just enough time passed for them to miss J*Davey and understand its value all over again. "We were never on a mission to stay relevant just for the sake of staying relevant," confirms Brook. "I either do this now or the next time I get off tour I'll be thirty-five. We toured for eight months of my pregnancy," confirms Jack. They were on the cover of L.A Weekly, touring coast-to coast in the US, touring Europe – but they felt it was just them going through the motions. "We both had two points of inspiration to bring to the table now."  Meanwhile, Brook was thrust into the midsts of an extremely hectic tour schedule with Miguel that would end up lasting almost three years, opening up for fellow superstars including Alicia Keys, Trey Songz, Mary J. Blige, Bruno Mars and Drake.  "Being on the Drake tour exposed me to trap on such a constant level – I've never been a trap or super hip hop guy; but being around it so intensely for that amount of time, I really got a feel of what's going on and what J*Davey already does. But it also exposed me to great new artists like Partynextdoor."  Indeed Brook's production on the first new material by the band in two years feels intrinsically modern: left-of-centre, dark RnB with new wave elements. That spirituality that J*Davey encompassed in the early noughties. "It's not new terrain, it's just a new cast of players. The game never really changes," muses Jack. There was a time when people thought J*Davey's music was too dark. Now that sound has spread further than anyone could have imagined - that spacious RnB sound. "Before we kind of did things backwards – we only had a little material and were doing all these shows – now we'd rather flood the market with material and build up towards the right shows, the right stuff at the right time. Timing is everything and it's the perfect time for our resurgence." And with that, J*Davey are ready to go back in – and let everybody know that the originators are back to grab the crown.

Band members
 Jack Davey - vocals, songwriter
 Brook D'Leau - keyboards, producer

Collaborators
 Thundercat - bass guitar

Discography

Albums
The Beauty in Distortion/The Land of the Lost (July 1, 2008 - Interdependent Media)
New Designer Drug (November 22, 2011 - ILLAV8R) re-released (2015)

EPs
Boudoir Synema: The Great Mistapes (Part 1) (2009)
Evil Christian Cop: The Great Mistapes (Part 2) (2011)
Rookie (2014)
POMP (2015)
Lite Wait Life (2016)

References

External links
 Official website

Musical groups from Los Angeles
American musical duos
American funk musical groups
Rock music duos